The ALTX East Africa Exchange (ALTX) is a stock exchange in Uganda. The ALTX operates under the jurisdiction of Uganda's Capital Markets Authority, which in turn reports to the Government of Uganda.

Trading
Its operations are entirely electronic, with all transactions completed online. The exchange lists foreign securities, bonds, and exchange traded funds. The exchange opened to trading on 13 July 2016. It accepts trades as low as US$3, targeting investors of modest means.

ALTX East Africa Exchange expanded its operations to Uganda after obtaining a regulatory approval in 2014, and depository approval in 2015.

Ownership
ALTX is a demutualised exchange wholly owned by ALTX Africa Group, a Mauritius based entity that also owns ALTX Clearing. GMEX Technologies of the United Kingdom owns 25 percent of ALTX Africa Group. Other investors include Joseph Kitamirike, the chief executive officer and co-founder of ALTX East Africa, and Jatin Jivram, director and co-founder of ALTX East Africa.

See also
Economy of Uganda
List of African stock exchanges
Uganda Securities Exchange
Ugandan shilling
List of stock exchanges in the Commonwealth of Nations

References

External links
ALTX East Africa unveils exchange platform
Website of ALTX East Africa Exchange

Stock exchanges in Africa
Finance in Uganda
Financial services companies of Uganda
Kampala District
2016 establishments in Uganda
Financial services companies established in 2016